Franklin S. Forsberg (October 21, 1905 – March 29, 2002), was an American publisher and diplomat.

Background
Franklin S. Forsberg was born in Salt Lake City, Utah, to parents of Swedish heritage. He received his B.A. from the University of Utah, where he was a member of the Pi Kappa Alpha fraternity, in 1930 and his M.B.A. from New York University in 1931.

Career
Forsberg was a teacher at Pace College and New York University from 1931 to 1937, and publisher with Street and Smith Publications in New York City from 1937 to 1942. In 1942 he joined the United States Army, where he rose to the rank of colonel. He helped start the publications Yank and Stars and Stripes. From 1946 to 1948 he was publisher and consultant with Forsberg and Church in New York City. He was publisher of Liberty Magazine in New York City (1948–50) and publisher and consultant with Forsberg, Merritt, Harrity and Church in New York City (1950–55). Forsberg was publisher of Popular Mechanics Publishing Co. in Chicago, Illinois from 1955 to 1959. From 1959 to 1972 he was a publisher with Holt, Rinehart and Winston in New York City. After a career as publisher, Forsberg was appointed U.S. ambassador to Sweden in 1981, a position he served in until 1985.

Honors
Forsberg was appointed "The Swedish-American of 1986" by the Vasa Order of America. 

H.E. Franklin S. Forsberg was Chairperson Emeriti of the Swedish Council of America during  the years 1991–1994

Death 
Forsberg died in Greenwich, Connecticut on Friday March 29, 2002.

References

Ambassadors of the United States to Sweden
American people of Swedish descent
1905 births
2002 deaths
University of Utah alumni
New York University Stern School of Business alumni
United States Army colonels
People from Salt Lake City